Saci is a character in Brazilian folklore. He is a one-legged black man, who smokes a pipe and wears a magical red cap that enables him to disappear and reappear wherever he wishes (usually in the middle of a Dirt devil). Considered an annoying prankster in most parts of Brazil, and a potentially dangerous and malicious creature in others, he nevertheless grants wishes to anyone who manages to trap him or steal his magic cap. However, his cap is often depicted as having a bad smell. Most people who claimed to have stolen this cap say they can never wash the smell away.

The legend says that a person can trap a Saci inside a bottle when he is in the form of a dust devil.

There are several variants of the myth, including: Saci-pererê, black as coal; Saci-trique, bi-racial and more benign; Saci-saçurá, with red eyes.

Powers, weaknesses, and habits
An incorrigible prankster, the Saci causes no major harm, but there is no little harm that he won't do. He hides children's toys, sets farm animals loose, teases dogs—and curses chicken eggs, preventing them from hatching. In the kitchen, the Saci spills salt, sours the milk, burns the bean stew, and drops flies into the soup. 

If a popcorn kernel fails to pop, it is because the Saci cursed it. Given half a chance, he dulls the seamstress's needles, hides her thimbles, and tangles her sewing threads. If he sees a nail lying on the ground, he turns the point up.  In short, people blame anything that goes wrong—in or outside the house—on the Saci.

Besides disappearing or becoming invisible (often with only his red cap and the red glow of his pipe still showing), the Saci can transform himself into a Matitaperê or Matita Pereira, an elusive bird whose melancholic song seems to come from nowhere.  One can escape a pursuing Saci by crossing a water stream.  The Saci dares not cross, for then he loses all his powers. Another way is to drop ropes full of knots. The Saci is compelled to stop and undo the knots. One can also try to appease him by leaving behind some cachaça, or some tobacco for his pipe.

He is fond of juggling embers or other small objects and letting them fall through the holes on his palms. An exceedingly nimble fellow, the lack of his right leg does not prevent him from bareback-riding a horse, and sitting cross-legged while puffing on his pipe (a feat comparable to the Headless Mule's gushing fire from the nostrils).

Every dust devil, says the legend, is caused by the spin-dance of an invisible Saci. One can capture him by throwing into the dust devil a rosary made of separately blessed prayer beads, or by pouncing on it with a sieve. With care, the captured Saci can be coaxed to enter a dark glass bottle, where he can be imprisoned by a cork with a cross marked on it. He can also be enslaved by stealing his cap, which is the source of his power. However, depending on the treatment he gets from his master, an enslaved Saci who regains his freedom may become either a trustworthy guardian and friend, or a devious and terrible enemy.

Origins of the legend

While some claim that the Saci myth originated in Europe in the 13th century such as the monopod, it probably derives from the Ŷaci-ŷaterê of Tupi-Guarani mythology, a magic one-legged child with bright red hair who would spell-bind people and break the forest's silence with his loud shouts and whistles. He was originally a creature of the night, and indeed the ŷaci means "Moon" in Old Tupi.

This indigenous character was appropriated and transformed in the 18th century by the African slaves who had been brought in large numbers to Brazil. Farm slaves would tell Saci stories to amuse and frighten the children. In this process the creature became black, his red hair metamorphosed into a red cap, and, as the African elders who usually told the tales, he came to be always smoking his clay-and-reed pipe. His name mutated into various forms, such as Saci Taperê and Sá Pereira (a common Portuguese name), and eventually Saci Pererê.

His red cap may have been inspired on the Trasgo, a mythical Portuguese creature with the exact same powers as the Saci. The Saci-Pererê concept shows some syncretism with Christian elements: he bolts away when faced with crosses, leaving behind a sulphurous smell – classical attributes of the devil in Christian folklore.

The concepts of imprisoning a supernatural being in a bottle by a magically marked cork, and of forcing him to grant wishes in return of his liberty, have obvious parallels in the story of Aladdin from the Arabian Nights. This may be more than just a coincidence, since some slaves were Muslims and thus presumably familiar with the Arabian tales. Moreover, the occupation of parts of the Portuguese territory (namely in the south) by the Muslim Moors, between the years 711 and 1249, provides another possible path for Arabian influence on the Saci legend.

In popular culture
 The character remains quite popular in present-day Brazilian urban culture, mainly due to the immensely popular children's book O Saci by Monteiro Lobato (1932). Saci also has appearances in other films and TV series adaptations of Sítio do Picapau Amarelo.
 In the 1960s, the one-legged gnome – by now "domesticated" into a prankish but inoffensive and lovable creature – was chosen by premier Brazilian cartoonist Ziraldo as the leading character of his comics magazine Turma do Pererê. This original publication, the first of its genre to feature entirely "national" characters, was short-lived, but paved the way for other Brazilian cartoonists like Angeli, Laerte and Mauricio de Sousa.
 The character also appears in manga Akuma-kun (1963–1964) of Shigeru Mizuki.
 Tom Jobim's song "Águas de Março" mentions the Matinta Pereira, and Nei Lopes's samba song entitled "Fumo de Rolo" tells a tale of a fisherman being accosted by the saci while collecting reeds in the forest. The Saci demands some tobacco for his pipe, but the poor fellow has lost his.
 Sport Club Internacional has the figure of Saci as its mascot, owing to the club's popular roots, the red color of his clothing and the fans' hope that the team could pull tricks on their opponents. When Wason Rentería played for the club, in the 2005 and 2006 seasons, he would often celebrate his goals by doing an impersonation of Saci.
 With the purpose of countering the growing trend of adopting the Anglo-Celtic Halloween in Brazil (in Portuguese called Dia das Bruxas), the Day of the Saci was created in 2005, and it is likewise commemorated on October 31. A tongue-in-cheek Society of Saci Observers was also created.
 In the 2012 video game Max Payne 3, set mainly in São Paulo, Brazil, a trickster Saci makes a cameo as a villain in the in-game cartoon show The Adventures of Captain Baseball Bat Boy. In it Saci has his trademark pipe, red cap and shorts, and is missing his right leg. However, his skin is green.
 The Saci appears in AdventureQuest Worlds. This version has a human-like appearance, wields a spoon, and has a tornado where his legs should be while also performing wind attacks.
 The Saci appears in Invisible City (2021), played by Wesley Guimarães.

In science
A novel species of dinosauromorph, discovered in 2001 at Agudo (southern Brazil), was named Sacisaurus because the fossil skeleton was missing one leg.

The names of the Brazilian satellites SACI-1 and SACI-2 were backronyms on the character's name, as well as four retrotransposons in the DNA of the fluke Schistosoma mansoni were named Saci-1, Saci-2, Saci-3, and Perere, for their ability to jump around in the parasite's genome

Since the Saci's one-legged physique reminds us of people with a physical disability, a social network named SACI (an acronym of Solidariedade, Apoio, Comunicação e Informação, or Solidarity, Support, Communication and Information) was created at the University of São Paulo with the purpose of stimulating these four efforts towards the social and medical rehabilitation of physically disabled people.

As a mascot
Despite being a one-legged creature, the character is believed to be very agile and powerful, always defeating his enemies. As so, it's a mascot of some sport clubs in Brazil such as Sport Club Internacional and Social Futebol Clube.

See also
Afro-Brazilian
Candomblé
Indigenous peoples of Brazil
Monopod (creature)
Prêmio Saci

References

External links
How Pedrinho captured the Saci, from Monteiro Lobato's O Saci (in Portuguese)
SOSACI
Picture of Saci
The Ziraldo's version of Saci
The legend of Saci
See the doc. Saci Documentary made in 2005

Brazilian folklore
Brazilian legendary creatures
Mythic humanoids
Pipe smoking
Supernatural legends
Legendary creatures with absent body parts